Michel Stievenard (born 21 September 1937 at Waziers) is a retired French footballer.

During his club career he played for RC Lens (1954–1961) and Angers SCO (1961–1969). He earned 2 caps for the France national football team in 1960, and was part of the squad that competed in the 1960 European Nations' Cup.

External links
FFF Profile

1937 births
Living people
French footballers
France international footballers
1960 European Nations' Cup players
RC Lens players
Angers SCO players
Ligue 1 players
Association football forwards
Sportspeople from Nord (French department)
Footballers from Hauts-de-France